Canadian Hearing Services was founded in 1940 to provide services for deaf and hard of hearing people in Ontario. Services include instruction in American and Quebec sign languages, interpreter services, deafblind intervenors, audiology and speech-language pathology. The CHS (Canadian Hearing Services) advocates for the hearing impaired in Canada through the support of 9-1-1 texting, visual fire alarms, and access to the justice system. The CHS handles emergency situations in hospitals, emergency rooms, after-hours clinics, shelters, and police services.

Services

Ontario interpreting services 
Ontario Interpreting Services (OIS) provides interpreting services across Ontario for American and Quebec sign language in some regions. They cover a range of public and personal events.

Workplace accessibility 
The workplace accessibility program assesses the workplace to ensure that there are no barriers for the deaf and hard of hearing. It provides seminars to "increase awareness of hearing loss in the workplace". Business staff and management are educated to raise awareness of hearing loss and provide strategies for communication, which includes holding accessible meetings.

Communication devices program 
The Communication Devices Program (CDP) was made on behalf of members who were "culturally deaf, orally deaf, deafened or hard of hearing". The main aim is to offer technical solutions to communication barriers. The CDP recommends devices (such as specialized alarm clocks, telephones, TTYs, and smoke alarms) for the home, workplace or business.

Video conferencing services 
The CHS provides video conferencing services (VCS) in 25 offices across Ontario. VCS allows for conferencing with up to 12 locations and can be used for many different purposes such as interviews, meetings or training sessions.

Audiology 
The CHS Audiology service is available in Hamilton, Mississauga, Toronto, Kenora, Sarnia, Windsor, Ottawa, Sudbury and Toronto East. The audiology program takes a holistic approach to hearing health care by looking at hearing loss and the ways in which it affects life. Audiologists provide hearing tests, hearing aid evaluations, hearing aid check-ups and fine tuning, and hearing aid fitting and dispensing for children and adults.

Hearing care counselling program 
The Hearing Care Counselling Program is available in 26 Ontario locations. This program is designed to assist seniors with hearing loss to adapt and stay connected. Priority is given to adults aged 55 and older, although younger adults are eligible for the program. Counsellors provide "home visits, education, demonstrations and recommendations of communication devices".

CONNECT counselling program 
The CONNECT Counselling Program is available in 26 locations across Ontario. CONNECT is a mental health counseling service provided by the CHS. CONNECT is a program designed to help individuals or families with deaf, deafened or hard of hearing members by providing them with counseling for a variety of reasons, including "mental health and illness, depression, relationship difficulties, abuse, family support, education, advocacy and counselling".

American Sign Language classes 
The CHS offers classes in American Sign Language.

Locations 
There are 22 Canadian Hearing Services locations across Ontario:
 Barrie
 Belleville
 Brantford
 Cornwall
 Durham
 Hamilton
 Kingston
 London
 Mississauga
 North Bay
 Ottawa
 Peterborough
 Sarnia
 Sault Ste Marie
 Scarborough, Toronto
 Sudbury
 Thunder Bay
 Timmins
 Toronto
 Waterloo
 Windsor
 York Region

References 

Deafness organizations
Deaf culture in Canada
Disability organizations based in Canada
Organizations based in Toronto